Gideon Hard (April 29, 1797 in Arlington, Bennington County, Vermont – April 27, 1885 in Albion, Orleans County, New York) was an American lawyer and politician from New York.

Life
He graduated from Union College in 1822. Then he studied law, was admitted to the bar in 1825, and commenced practice in Newport (now Albion), New York, in 1826.

Hard was elected as an Anti-Mason to the 23rd, and re-elected as an Anti-Jacksonian to the 24th United States Congress, holding office from March 4, 1833, to March 3, 1837.

He was Commissioner of Schools of Barre, New York from 1841 to 1848; and a member of the New York State Senate from 1842 to 1847, sitting in the 65th, 66th, 67th, 68th, 69th and 70th New York State Legislatures.

He was a Canal Appraiser from 1849 to 1850. Afterwards he resumed the practice of law. He was First Judge and Surrogate of the Orleans County Court from 1856 to 1860.

He was buried at the Mount Albion Cemetery.

External links

1797 births
1885 deaths
People from Arlington, Vermont
Anti-Masonic Party members of the United States House of Representatives from New York (state)
19th-century American politicians
New York (state) National Republicans
National Republican Party members of the United States House of Representatives
New York (state) Whigs
New York (state) state court judges
New York (state) state senators
People from Orleans County, New York
People from Albion, Orleans County, New York
Union College (New York) alumni
19th-century American judges